Shahr-e Khafr (also Romanized as Shahr Khafr; also known as Khafr and Shahr-e Kheẕr) is a village in Khafr Rural District, Khafr District, Jahrom County, Fars Province, Iran. At the 2006 census, its population was 2,501, in 641 families.

References 

Populated places in  Jahrom County